Dump truck may refer to:
Dump truck for hauling loose material
Dumptruck (band) for the 80s indie band
Dumper, similar to a dump truck but carries the load in front
Garbage truck for collecting refuse
Haul truck an off-road vehicle used in mining

Dump Truck may refer to:
Dump Truck, a song by Blind Melon on their album Soup
The Dump Truck, a nickname of sumo wrestler Konishiki Yasokichi
"Dumptruck" Song by hip-hop group: Kinfolk Thugs
A secure online cloud file storage service by Golden Frog